Thomas Pereira or Tomás Pereira (1 November 1645 – 1708), also known as Tomé Pereira, was a Portuguese Jesuit, mathematician and scientist who worked as a missionary in Qing China.

Pereira was born in Vila Nova de Famalicão. He arrived in China in 1672 and first stayed in the Portuguese colony of Macau, where he was enrolled in the University College of St. Paul. Pereira was later sent to Beijing to work in the court of the Kangxi Emperor, where he stayed during most of his career. In 1689, the Kangxi Emperor sent Pereira and his colleague Jean-François Gerbillon to interpret at the negotiations between Qing China and the Russian Empire in Nerchinsk, which eventually resulted in the Treaty of Nerchinsk.

Between 1688 and 1694, Pereira and Antoine Thomas were unofficial directors of the imperial observatory in Beijing as the actual director was not in China at the time.

He was buried in the Jesuits' Zhalan Cemetery in Beijing.

Further reading

Joseph Schobert Sebes, The Treaty of Nerchinsk (Nipchu) 1689. A Case Study of the Initial Period of Sino-Russian Diplomatic Relations Based on the Unpublished Diary of Father Thomas Pereyra of the Society of Jesus.  (1957-8)

1645 births
1708 deaths
Portuguese Roman Catholic missionaries
17th-century Portuguese Jesuits
Portuguese diplomats
Portuguese astronomers
Portuguese expatriates in China
Jesuit missionaries in China
People from Vila Nova de Famalicão
17th-century Portuguese mathematicians
Jesuit missionaries
18th-century Portuguese mathematicians